The Green River is a  tributary of the Buffalo River in Tennessee. By the Buffalo River and the Duck River it is a tributary of the Tennessee River. The Green River is one of the main streams of Wayne County.  Situated in the southwestern corner of Middle Tennessee along the Alabama line, Wayne County is one of the state's largest counties in area but is very sparsely populated.  Most of the county is located on the Southern Highland Rim, an area of hills, ridges, and narrow stream valleys that is largely underlain by Paleozoic limestone.

It is the source of the Waynesboro municipal water supply. The river lives up to its name, often showing a deep bluish-green color, especially in its downstream reaches.

This Green River should not be confused with the Green River in Kentucky, which is a tributary of the Ohio River and has a very small portion of its drainage basin in north-central Tennessee.

See also
List of rivers of Tennessee

References

Rivers of Tennessee
Bodies of water of Wayne County, Tennessee